Antonín Vaníček (born 22 April 1998) is a professional Czech football midfielder currently playing for FK Mladá Boleslav in the Czech First League.

He made his league debut in Bohemians 1905's Czech First League 1–1 draw at Sparta Prague on 30 July 2017. He scored his first league goal on 28 October in Bohemians' 1–1 home draw against Zlín.

References

External links

 
 Antonín Vaníček official international statistics
 
 Antonín Vaníček profile on the Bohemians 1905 official website

Czech footballers
Czech Republic youth international footballers
1998 births
Living people
Czech First League players
Bohemians 1905 players
Association football midfielders
SK Sparta Krč players
FK Jablonec players
FK Mladá Boleslav players